Gabriel Veyre was an early film director and photographer born in France, but mainly known for his work in Mexico, Indochina and Morocco.

Biography 
Veyre graduated in pharmacy from Lyon University. In 1896, he traveled along with Claude Ferdinand Bon Bernard to Latin America, in order to show the early films made by the Lumière Brothers and to exploit the cinematograph.

Between 1896 and 1897, he directed and produced 35 films in Mexico, with Von Bernard as the camera operator. Many of those films feature the Mexican president Porfirio Díaz in daily activities.

After leaving Mexico, he continued touring Canada, Japan, China and Indochina. His films and autochromes were presented in Paris in the 1900 Exposition Universelle.

He continued his work in Morocco where he also worked as a correspondent for L'Illustration. He published the book Dans l'intimité du Sultan in 1905. Veyre remained in Casablanca until his death in 1936.

Some of his work is preserved at the Cinémathèque Française.

Bibliography
 Gabriel Veyre, Dans l'intimité du Sultan, au Maroc 1901-1905, reissued in 2009, 251p.
Philippe Jacquier et Marion Pranal, éd. Institut Lumière / Actes Sud, 1996, 289p.
Farid Abdelouahab, Philippe Jacquier et Marion Pranal, Le Maroc de Gabriel Veyre : 1901-1936, Kubik Editions, 2005, 191p.

External links

 

 Collection Gabriel Veyre
 Gabriel Veyre in México (In Spanish)

1871 births
1936 deaths
French film directors
French photographers
University of Lyon alumni